Svetlana Vasiliyevna Klyuka (born 27 December 1978 in Belogorsk, Amur Oblast) is a Russian middle distance runner. Klyuka ran the sixth fastest women's 800m time in the world in 2006 (1:57:21 minutes).

Career 
She was the winner of the 2005 Universiade and the 2006 European Cup. She was a silver medallist at the 2006 European Athletics Championships and placed fourth at the 2008 Beijing Olympics. She is a three-time participant at the World Championships in Athletics, having reached the final in 2007 and the semi-finals in both 2003 and 2009.

Klyuka received a two-year ban from the sport for doping after her biological passport showed abnormalities. The ban was set for the periods from February 2011 to 2013 and all her performances from 15 August 2009 up to that period were erased.

Achievements

References

External links 
 http://www.viewimages.com/Search.aspx?mid=71599216&epmid=2&partner=Google

1978 births
Living people
People from Belogorsk, Amur Oblast
Russian female middle-distance runners
Athletes (track and field) at the 2008 Summer Olympics
Olympic athletes of Russia
Doping cases in athletics
Russian sportspeople in doping cases
European Athletics Championships medalists
Universiade medalists in athletics (track and field)
Universiade gold medalists for Russia
Sportspeople from Amur Oblast
Medalists at the 2005 Summer Universiade